Santiago "Santi" Freixa i Escudé (born 13 February 1983) is a Spanish field hockey coach and former player who played for the Spain national team as a forward.

In November 2015, Freixa received the Athletes in Excellence Award from The Foundation for Global Sports Development, in recognition of his community service efforts and work with youth.

Club career
Freixa played in Spain for his local club Atètic Terrassa until 2006, when he joined Dutch club Amsterdam in Amstelveen. In 2015 he announced his retirement from professional field hockey. He still played a few matches for the first team of Amsterdam the next season because of an injury crisis. He was the head coach of the first women's team of SV Kampong from 2016 until 2019. In April 2019, he agreed to be the head coach of the first men's team of his former club Amsterdam from the 2019–20 season onwards.

International career
He earned his first cup in 2000 against The Netherlands. In 2004, Freixa was named Talent of the Year by the International Hockey Federation and won the Champions Trophy with Spain in Lahore. At the 2012 Summer Olympics, he competed for the national team in the men's tournament, captaining the side. He played for the Spanish national team until 2014.

References

External links
 

1983 births
Living people
Field hockey players from Catalonia
Spanish male field hockey players
Male field hockey forwards
Spanish field hockey coaches
Olympic field hockey players of Spain
Sportspeople from Terrassa
Field hockey players at the 2004 Summer Olympics
2006 Men's Hockey World Cup players
Field hockey players at the 2008 Summer Olympics
Field hockey players at the 2012 Summer Olympics
2014 Men's Hockey World Cup players
Olympic silver medalists for Spain
Olympic medalists in field hockey
Medalists at the 2008 Summer Olympics
Amsterdamsche Hockey & Bandy Club players
Expatriate field hockey players
Spanish expatriate sportspeople in the Netherlands
Atlètic Terrassa players
Men's Hoofdklasse Hockey players
División de Honor de Hockey Hierba players